Hirgan (also Romanized as Hīrgān) is a village in Kahnuk Rural District, Irandegan District, Khash County, Sistan and Baluchestan Province, Iran. At the 2006 census, its population was 48, in 9 families.

References 

Populated places in Khash County